Thomas Edwards VC (19 April 1863 – 27 March 1953) born in England, was a recipient of the Victoria Cross, the highest and most prestigious award for gallantry in the face of the enemy that can be awarded to British and Commonwealth forces.

Details
He was 20 years old, and a private in the 1st Battalion, The Black Watch (Royal Highlanders), British Army during the Mahdist War when the following deed took place for which he was awarded the VC.

On 13 March 1884 at the Battle of Tamai, Sudan, when both members of the crew of one of the Gatling guns had been killed, Private Edwards, after bayoneting two Arabs and himself receiving a wound from a spear, remained with the gun, defending it throughout the action. His citation reads:

Medal
His Victoria Cross is displayed at the Black Watch Museum in Balhousie Castle, Perth, Scotland.

References

External links
Location of grave and VC medal (Essex)
 Victoriacross.org

1863 births
1953 deaths
British recipients of the Victoria Cross
Black Watch soldiers
British Army personnel of the Mahdist War
People from Aylesbury Vale
British Army personnel of the Anglo-Egyptian War
British Army recipients of the Victoria Cross